Domestiques  is the Delgados' debut album. It was released on their own label, Chemikal Underground, on 28 October 1996.  The title (literally "servants" in French) is a reference to the support team for the team leader in road bicycle racing.

Track listing
All songs by The Delgados
"Under Canvas Under Wraps" – 2:40
"Leaning on a Cane" – 2:56
"Strathcona Slung" – 3:29
"Tempered; Not Tamed" – 3:48
"One More Question" – :55
"Big Business in Europe" – 2:36
"Falling and Landing" – 3:22
"Akumulator" – 3:20
"Sucrose" – 3:23
"Pinky" – 3:44
"Friendly Conventions" – 2:06
"Smaller Mammals" – 1:43
"4th Channel" – 2:32
"D'Estus Morte" – 2:52

Personnel
Alun Woodward – vocals, guitar
Emma Pollock – vocals, guitar
Stewart Henderson – bass guitar
Paul Savage – drums
Alan Barr – string arrangements
The Delgados – producer, engineer, string arrangements
Van Impe – artwork, art direction

References 

The Delgados albums
1996 albums
Chemikal Underground albums